Parliamentary elections were held in Senegal on 9 May 1993. The result was a victory for the ruling Socialist Party, which won 84 of the 120 seats. Voter turnout was around 41%.

Results

References

Further reading

Senegal
Elections in Senegal
Parliamentary
Senegal